Ivo Symes (10 December 1909 – 11 June 2002) was a New Zealand cricketer. He played in three first-class matches for Wellington from 1934 to 1936.

See also
 List of Wellington representative cricketers

References

External links
 

1909 births
2002 deaths
New Zealand cricketers
Wellington cricketers
Cricketers from Whanganui